Sparna bosqi is a species of beetle in the family Cerambycidae. It was described by Gilmour in 1954. It is known from Bolivia and Peru.

References

Colobotheini
Beetles described in 1954